Tokitsuyama Jin'ichi (March 10, 1925 – November 21, 1968) was a professional sumo wrestler from Iwaki, Fukushima, Japan who wrestled for Tatsunami stable.  He won the top division sumo championship in the summer tournament of 1953 and was runner-up in five other tournaments. His highest rank was sekiwake. After his retirement in 1961 he worked as a coach at Tatsunami stable until his death in 1968.

Life and career 
At a young age his parents divorced and he was raised by his grandparents. His first professional tournament was in May 1940 as a wrestler for the former incarnation of Tokitsukaze stable, which was a leftover from the days of Osaka sumo. The stable soon closed however, and he transferred to Tatsunami stable. He tried out a number of ring names before settling on Tokitsuyama to honor the defunct stable he originally debuted for.

He was a weak wrestler at first, and he was not able to actually be listed on the sumo ranking sheet known as the banzuke until the January tournament of 1943. He did not really bloom as a strong competitor until after returning as a soldier from World War II. In the 1946 tournament (the only one held that year) he achieved a 7–0 perfect record and also took the championship in the makushita division. Expectations surrounding him began to rise after this. He was promoted to the salaried ranks of jūryō in the following summer tournament of 1947. He was promoted to the top division makuuchi in May 1949, but received a losing record and fell back to jūryō. He was soon back in makuuchi though, and in September 1950 at maegashira 21 he achieved a 12–3 record and the Fighting Spirit Prize. He was a top division regular from then on.  Almost three years later, in May 1953 he achieved his one and only top division championship with a perfect 15–0 record. However, as he was only ranked at maegashira 6, the highest ranked opponent he faced that tournament was a komusubi and the two ōzeki at the time Yoshibayama and Tochinishiki, who also had winning streaks in that tournament, never had a chance to face him to even the odds. In the January 1955 tournament he was in a similar situation at maegashira 9. He was in position to win the championship on the final day of the tournament, but this time had to face yokozuna Chiyonoyama in a playoff, which he lost. He was a consistent makuuchi wrestler for many years after this, but began to decline after 1960.

Retirement from sumo
Tokisuyama retired before the 1961 March tournament rather than face demotion to jūryō. He remained in the sumo world after his retirement as an elder of the Japan Sumo Association under the name of Oshiogawa, but died of liver cancer at age 43 in November 1968.

Fighting style
During his career, Tokitsuyama was known for using a variety of techniques such as lifting and inner-thigh throws, and would often twist and turn even the strongest opponents all over the dohyō. This reliance on such techniques also led to inconsistency, and though he was a formidable opponent, he never had more than 12 wins in any tournament besides his championship tournament and was never promoted above sekiwake. Regardless, he was part of a group of well-known top division wrestlers from his same Tatsunami stable at this time, namely Wakahaguro, Annenyama and Kitanonada who were popularly known then as the Four Heavenly Kings, a Buddhist reference.

Pre-modern sumo record
In 1953 the New Year tournament was begun and the Spring tournament began to be held in Osaka.

Modern sumo record
Since the addition of the Kyushu tournament in 1957 and the Nagoya tournament in 1958, the yearly schedule has remained unchanged.

See also 
 Glossary of sumo terms
 List of past sumo wrestlers
List of sumo tournament top division champions
List of sumo tournament top division runners-up
List of sekiwake

References

1925 births
Japanese sumo wrestlers
Sumo people from Fukushima Prefecture
Sekiwake
1968 deaths